David Mandić (born 14 September 1997) is a Croatian handball player for MT Melsungen and the Croatian national team.

He participated at the 2019 World Men's Handball Championship.

Honours
HRK Izviđač
Handball Championship of Bosnia and Herzegovina: 2015–16
Croatia
Mediterranean Games: 2018

References

External links

1997 births
Living people
People from Ljubuški
Croatian male handball players
Croats of Bosnia and Herzegovina
Mediterranean Games medalists in handball
Mediterranean Games gold medalists for Croatia
RK Zagreb players
Competitors at the 2018 Mediterranean Games